A list of people, who died during the 20th century, who have received recognition as Blessed (through beatification) or Saint (through canonization) from the Catholic Church:

See also 

Christianity in the 20th century

20
 Christian saints
20th-century venerated Christians
Lists of 20th-century people